{{DISPLAYTITLE:C10H8S}}
The molecular formula C10H8S (molar mass: 160.24 g/mol, exact mass: 160.0347 u) may refer to:

 1-Naphthalenethiol
 2-Naphthalenethiol